The University of Harderwijk (1648–1811), also named the Guelders Academy, was located in the city of Harderwijk, in the Republic of the United Provinces (now: the Netherlands). It was founded by the province of Guelders (Gelre).

History
The university of Harderwijk did not have a good reputation, because of its low standards. Nevertheless, it attracted many students with its low fees. Many students went to Harderwijk to graduate. In Samuel Johnson's Life of Herman Boerhaave, it says:
"He went to Hardewich, in order to take the degree of doctor in physick, which he obtained in July, 1693, having performed a publick disputation, "de utilitate explorandorum excrementorum in ægris, ut signorum."

The title of this Latin disputation in English is "On the usefulness of examination of excrement as a sign of disease".

The most famous foreign graduate, Linnaeus, stayed only a week, much of which time was spent printing his dissertation. The saying was that rich students could afford Leiden University and the poorer ones had to make do with Harderwijk. In many European cities, it was not possible to get a doctor's degree, and the Netherlands had a reputation for producing very good doctors; David de Gorter is an example of such a doctor. He was a professor at the University of Harderwijk and friends with Linnaeus. He also was a royal physician to Empress Elizabeth of Russia.

The university was closed in 1811 during the French occupation. Later, king William I tried to re-establish the university, without success.

Modern culture 
In the 1990s, The University became more known to a new audience thanks to the fictional character Prof. Fetze Alsvanouds ("Als vanouds" loosely translated as "like the good old days"), who was played by Aart Staartjes and regularly appeared in the Dutch children's television program Het Klokhuis. Alsvanouds was a professor at the University of Harderwijk, and he declaimed all kind of false and often ridiculous 'scientific' explanations for common things in everyday life for children.

Notable alumni
Some well-known graduates of the University of Harderwijk are
Hungarian encyclopedist János Apáczai Csere (1651)
artist Romeyn de Hooghe
explorer Jacob Roggeveen (1690)
physician and chemist Hieronymus David Gaubius
physician Herman Boerhaave (1693)
Swedish scientist Carl Linnaeus (1735)
Hungarian linguist János Uri (1749)
explorer Robert Jacob Gordon (1759)
statesman Herman Willem Daendels (1783)
poet A.C.W. Staring (1787)

See also 
 List of early modern universities in Europe

References

External links
 http://www.destentor.nl/regio/veluwewest/932420/Pedel-regeert-weer-op-universiteit.ece (in Dutch)

 
1811 disestablishments in the Netherlands
1648 establishments in the Dutch Republic
Harderwijk, University of
Education in Gelderland
Education in the Dutch Republic
Harderwijk, University of
Harderwijk